Dorothy and the Wizard of Oz is an American animated children's television series loosely based on L. Frank Baum's 1900 novel The Wonderful Wizard of Oz and its subsequent books, as well as its 1939 film adaptation. The series debuted on Boomerang SVOD on June 29, 2017. The series was picked up for the second and third seasons. The series ended on July 31, 2020, lasting for three years.

Plot
After the Wicked Witch of the West was melted by water, Queen Ozma has appointed Dorothy Gale the Princess of Emerald City. With her feet firmly grounded in her ruby slippers, Dorothy tackles her royal duties with enthusiasm, bravery, kindness and farm girl feistiness. And whether it's magic, Munchkins, flying monkeys or her nemesis Wilhelmina, the wicked witch-in-training and niece of the Wicked Witch of the West, Dorothy is ready to track down and put a stop to any problem that comes Oz's way with help from her dog Toto and their friends Scarecrow, Tin Man and Cowardly Lion.

At the start of the second season, the Wizard of Oz ends up back in Oz after getting mixed up in another tornado. Now that he has returned at last, he plots to make himself into a real wizard by getting actual magic powers. When he finds out about the Wicked Witch's spirit being trapped in her crystal ball, he decides to help resurrect her in exchange for powers (not knowing that it takes years to get powers), but it backfired and Dorothy accidentally resurrects the Wicked Witch without her powers. Regardless on the outcome, this puts the Land of Oz in serious danger now.

Characters

Main
 Dorothy Gale (voiced by Kari Wahlgren) – She now lives in Oz and is the new Princess of Emerald City. Friendly and kind, Dorothy is always willing to help out her friends, introduce the Ozians to customs from back in Kansas and fight all evil in Oz. She is able to click her ruby slippers. In Season 3, she has unlocked additional uses for it, including the ability to create objects such as red pillows, four individual protective red forcefields around herself and three allies, a large force field around all of them, a catcher's mitt and a giant bowling ball.
 Scarecrow (voiced by Bill Fagerbakke) – Now that he has a brain, he can finally help provide useful information to his friends when going on adventures.
 Tin Man (voiced by JP Karliak) – He has finally gotten his heart, but also provides the gang with useful items contained inside of him.
 Cowardly Lion (voiced by Jess Harnell) – He is the not-so fearless king of the forest.
 Queen Ozma (voiced by Kari Wahlgren) – The Queen of Emerald City and Dorothy's best friend. Formerly trapped by the Nome King, Dorothy rescued Ozma and took her rightful place as queen.
 Glinda the Good Witch (voiced by Grey Griffin) - The Good Witch of the South and an ally of Dorothy.
 Wizard of Oz (voiced by Tom Kenny) - The former ruler of Oz when Ozma was missing. He later returned to Oz in season two in order to become an actual wizard.

Villains
 Wicked Witch of the West (voiced by Laraine Newman) - An old enemy of Dorothy who was melted upon getting hit with water. Her spirit resided in the crystal ball advising Wilhemina to get the Ruby Slippers needed to restore her.
 Wilhelmina (voiced by Jessica DiCicco) – The spoiled niece of the Wicked Witches of the East and West. Her goal is to get rid of Dorothy and obtain the Ruby Slippers so that she and her aunt can rule the Land of Oz. Unlike her aunts however, Wilhelmina does not have a weakness to water as seen when she once fell into the Truth Pond.
 Frank and Lyman (voiced by Steve Blum and Jess Harnell) – Wilhelmina's winged monkey henchmen who often unsuccessfully attempt to hinder Dorothy and her friends in order to obtain the ruby slippers and give it to Wilhelmina. Frank is the larger winged monkey and Lyman is the smaller incompetent winged monkey. They are named after the author of the original Oz books Lyman Frank Baum.
 Nome King (voiced by J.P. Karliak) - The ruler of the Nome Kingdom who conspires to rule the Land of Oz. Like the books, he has a fear of eggs and chickens.
 Kaliko (voiced by Bill Fagerbakke) - A Nome who is the servant of the Nome King.

Other characters
 Patchwork Girl (voiced by Jessica DiCicco) – A human-sized female rag doll who is Scarecrow's love interest.

Episodes

Broadcast
Dorothy and the Wizard of Oz debuted on Boomerang USA Channel on May 8, 2018. It also premiered on Boomerang in Australia and New Zealand on June 26, 2017. The first 13 episodes were released on Boomerang's SVOD service in the United States on June 29, 2017.

Nearly a year later, the series premiered on the Boomerang channel in the United States on May 21, 2018. The series premiered on Boomerang in Africa in October 2017. The show was also premiered on Boomerang in the United Kingdom on October 2, 2017.

In Canada, the series premiered on Treehouse TV on June 2, 2018.

The series later started airing on Cartoon Network on December 21, 2018.

Home media
We're Not in Kansas Anymore, a DVD containing the first 10 episodes of the series, was released on March 27, 2018. "Emerald City" was the second DVD released for the series on June 12, 2018 with 10 episodes.

References

External links
 
 Dorothy and the Wizard of Oz on Boomerang

2010s American animated television series
2020s American animated television series
2017 American television series debuts
2020 American television series endings
American children's animated adventure television series
American children's animated comedy television series
American children's animated fantasy television series
American television shows based on children's books
Animated television shows based on films
Animated television series about children
Animated television series about dogs
Animated television series about lions
Animated television series based on The Wizard of Oz
The Wizard of Oz (1939 film)
English-language television shows
Television series by Warner Bros. Animation
Boomerang (TV network) original programming